The National Historic Heritage of Brazil are buildings, monuments, structures, objects and sites deemed of historic or cultural importance to the country. The register is maintained by the National Institute of Historic and Artistic Heritage of Brazil. This designation insures protection under federal law. The following is a list of National Historic Heritage sites by state:

List of National Historic Heritage of Brazil

Alagoas

Amapá

Amazonas

Bahia

Cairu
 Morro de São Paulo Fountain
 Morro de São Paulo Fort
 Saint Anthony Church and Convent

Candeias
 Engenho Freguesia
 Engenho Matoim

Castro Alves
 Saint Joseph of Genipapo Chapel

Ilhéus
 Our Lady of Santana Chapel

Itaparica
 Architectural and urban site of the Church of the Holy Sacrament
 Saint Lawrence Fort
 Saint Lawrence Church

Ituaçu
 Mangabeira Grotto

Jacobina
 Bom Jesus da Glória Chapel
 Our Lady of the Immaculate Conception Church

Jaguaripe
 Building at Rua da Ajuda, 1
 Municipal Palace
 Main Church of Our Lady of Help

Lauro de Freitas
 Parish of Santo Amaro Ipitanga

Lençóis
 Architectural and landscape site of Lençóis

Maragogipe
 São Roque farm's house and chapel
 Municipal Palace
 Santa Cruz of Paraguassu Fort
 Main Church of São Bartolomeu

Mata de São João
 Garcia d'Ávila's Castle

Monte Santo
 Architectural, urban, natural and landscape site of Serra do Monte Santo

Mucugê
 Architectural and landscape site of Mucugê

Nazaré
 House at Travessa da Capela, 2, known as Solar Ataíde

 Our Lady of Conception Church
 Lady of Nazaré of Camamu Church
 Our Lady of Nazaré Main Church

Palmeiras
 Landscape site of Pai Inácio hill

Porto Seguro
 Architectural and landscape site of Cidade Alta de Porto Seguro
 Architectural and landscape site of Porto Seguro

Rio de Contas
 City Council and Jail
 House at Barão de Macaúbas, 11
 House of the Baron of Macaúbas
 Architectural site of Rio de Contas
 Holy Sacrament Main Church, including:
 Two torches
 Another two, smaller torches
 A processional cross
 Six pallium staffs
 Two thuribles
 A big, golden monstrance
 A small, silver monstrance
 Church of Sant'Ana ruins

Salvador
 Church of Nosso Senhor do Bonfim, Salvador
 Chapel of Help
 Chapel of Our Lady of the Stairs
 Chapel of the Holy Body
 Chapel and Monastery of Monte Serrat
 Chapel of Our Lady of Sorrows and Gathering of the Good Jesus of Forgiveness
 House at Frederico Pontes Avenue
 House at Joana Angélica Avenue, 149
 Architectural elements of house at Sete de Setembro Avenue, 59, including:
 Ground floor:
 Noble stone carved door cover, with its respective nail finish and further component parts
 Two wooden doors, on the inside of the hall, both with iron flags, and one with wooden lintel and jamb
 First floor:
 Grid room divider, in cropped wood, acting as a seal to the bulging arch between the superior hall and an internal room
 Main hall door
 Hall cupboard door
 Second floor:
 Four doors, with their respective lintels and jambs, one of which sports a door lock mirror
 Two windows, with wickets, in the dining room
 House at Baixa do Bonfim, 236
 House at Carlos Gomes, 57
 House at Inácio Alcioly, 4
 House of the Seven Lamps
 House of Castro Alves
 House at 28 de Setembro, 8
 Casa Pia and College of the Orphans of Saint Joachim
 Tiles from Federal University of Bahia's rectory
 Architectural, urban and landscape site of Ana Nery square
 Architectural, urban and landscape site of Severino Vieira square
 Architectural, urban and landscape site of the hill of Saint Antônio of Barra
 Architectural, urban and landscape site of parts of the subdistrict of Penha, including:
 Euzébio de Matos square
 Slope of Bonfim
 Teodósio Rodrigues de Faria square
 Senhor do Bonfim square
 Professor Santos Reis street
 Stretch of Beira Mar avenue
 Divina square
 Benjamin Constant street
 Teodósio Costa street, until aforementioned Senhor do Bonfim square
 Architectural, urban and landscape site of parts of the subdistrict of Conceição da Praia, including:
 Marcílio Dias square
 Manoel Vitorino street
 Stretch of Visconde de Mauá street
 Dionísio Martins street
 Stretch of Sodré street
 Macedo Costa street
 Architectural, urban and landscape site of public places on the perimeter of the subdistricts of Sé and Passo:
 Monte Alegre street
 Achieta square
 Inácio Acióli street
 Stretch of Doze de Outubro street
 Santa Isabel street
 Moniz Barreto street
 Frei Vicente street
 Gregório de Matos street
 Ângelo Ferraz street
 José Alencar square
 Padre Agostinho Gomes street
 Eduardo Carizé street
 João de Brito street
 Quinze Mistérios square
 Custódio de Melo street
 Stretch of Joaquim Távora street
 Barão do Triunfo square
 Luís Viana street
 Ribeiro dos Santos street
 Stretch of Silva Jardim street
 Alfredo Brito street
 Quinze de Novembro square
 Architectural, urban and landscape site of public places on the perimeter of the subdistricts of Mares and Penha:
 Adriano Gordilho square
 Rio Araguaçu street
 Rio Almada street
 Belt of coastal waters, until aforementioned Adriano Gordilho square
 Architectural, urban and landscape site included in stretches of Otávio Mangabeira avenue comprising Chega Negro and Piatã beaches, in the subdistrict of Itapoã
 Architectural, urban and landscape site Historical Center of the City of Salvador
 Architectural site of Carneiro de Campos Sodré and Travessa Aquino Gaspar streets
 Levee, with its current water limits, comprising the urban and forest sites of the circling valleys, in subdistricts of Vitória, S. Pedro, Santana and Brotas
 Building at Cairú square, where the Model Market is located
 Building of the old Church and Hospice of Our Lady of the Good Journey and churchyard

 Fort of São Pedro
 Fort of Barbalho or Our Lady of Monte do Carmo
 Fort of Monte Serrat
 Fort of Santa Maria
 Fort of Santo Antônio da Barra
 Fort of São Marcelo
 Fort of São Paulo of Gambôa
 Cathedral Basilica of Salvador
 Church of Good Journey, along with the old Hospice which is inseparable architecturally and constructively
 Church of Mouraria
 Church of the Third Order of Saint Francis
 Church of Palma
 Church of the Blessed Sacrament at Rua do Passo
 Church of Our Lady of Conception of Boqueirão, along with all its belongings
 Church of Our Lady of Barroquinha
 Church of Our Lady of Conception of the Beach 
 Church of Our Lady of Penha and old Summer Palace of the Archbishops, including walkway that connects said buildings 
 Church of Our Lady of Health 
 Church of Our Lady of Snows 
 Church of Santo Antônio of Barra 
 Church of São Miguel 
 Church of Saint Peter of the Clergymen 
 Convent and Church of Our Lady of Lapa 
 Convent and Church of Desterro 
 Church of Pilar 
 Church of the Third Order of Our Lady of the Rosary of the Black People 
 Church and House of the Third Order of São Domingos 

 Church of the Third Order of Mount Carmel 
 Church and Convent of Saint Teresa 
 São Francisco Church and Convent 
  and  
 Church and Monastery of Our Lady of Grace 
  
 Church and Holy House of Mercy of Bahia 
 Church of the Holy Sacrament and Sant'Ana 
 Epitaphs on  
 Baron of Cajaíba family mausoleum, notably the statue of Faith, authored by Johann von Halbig 
 Pascoal cross public oratory 
 Berquó Mansion 
 Palace of the Commercial Association of Bahia 
 Archbishop's Palace of Salvador 
 Palace of the Count of the Arches 
  
  
 Park and fountain of Queimado 
 Door of the 17th century mansion that currently houses the Secretary of Education and Health 
 Building at J. Castro Rebelo, 5 
 Building at Militão Lisboa, 80

Paraíba

References

External links
IPHAN - Official website List of National Historic Heritage sites .

Heritage registers in Brazil
National Heritage